The Dirty Sock Funtime Band was an American rock band formed in New York City. "A rock band for kids that really rocks," in the words of Chris Barron of the Spin Doctors, who is a featured vocalist on the CD "Mr. Clown and the Day the Sun Got Wet". They were featured on the Noggin TV program Jack's Big Music Show and were also invited to compose music for a Nick Jr. recycling PSA titled "Playful Parent", and band member Mike Messer sang a rocked-up version of the Wonder Pets theme for a commercial promoting the show's new season at the time. They won a 2006 Time Out NY Kids Reader's Choice Award for Best NYC-Based Kids' Band.

The group silently retired after 2020. Mike Messer continues to perform and release music as a solo artist.

Members
 Mike Messer – Guitar and vocals
 Stephen Jacobs – Guitar and vocals
 Adam Jacobs (Mr. Clown) – Vocals
 William Phillips (Billy Z) – Guitar
 Sean Dixon – Drums
 Annie Elmer – Dancer

Former members
 Uwe Petersen – Drums
 Eric Rockwin – Bass guitar and vocals
 Paul Chuffo – Drums
 Nadine Nassar – Dancer 
 Diana Ferrante – Dancer
 Ken Thomson – Saxophone

Discography

CDs 
 Search & Rescue of Genius Backpack (2003)
 Mr. Clown and the Day the Sun Got Wet (2004)

References

External links

Rock music groups from New York (state)